Qaiser Shehzad (born 1 December 1986) is a Pakistani first-class cricketer who played for Multan cricket team.

References

External links
 

1986 births
Living people
Pakistani cricketers
Multan cricketers
People from Okara District